Oh Se-hun (born April 12, 1994), also known mononymously as Sehun, is a South Korean rapper, singer, songwriter, actor, model, and dancer. He is a member of the South Korean-Chinese boy group Exo, its sub-group Exo-K and sub-unit Exo-SC. Apart from his group's activities, Oh has also had supporting roles in various television dramas and films such as Secret Queen Makers (2018) and Now, We Are Breaking Up (2021), and starred in Dokgo Rewind (2018).

Early life
Oh was born in Jungnang-gu, Seoul, South Korea, on April 12, 1994. He graduated from the School of Performing Arts Seoul in February 2013. He has an older brother.

Career
Oh was first scouted by an SM Entertainment casting agent at 12 years old while he was out having lunch with friends, he was eventually cast into SM Entertainment in 2008. He went through four auditions in two years. On January 10, 2012, Oh became the fifth Exo member to be officially introduced to the public. The group made their debut with the extended play Mama in April 2012.

In February 2016, Oh received a Weibo Star Award as voted by users of the Chinese social networking site Sina Weibo at the 5th Gaon Chart K-Pop Awards. In March 2016, Oh was cast as the male lead in the upcoming Korean-Chinese film Catman, which was released in 2018. In July 2016, Oh was announced to be starring as the male lead in the upcoming Korean-Chinese web drama Dear Archimedes, which began airing in 2019.

In September 2017, Oh became a fixed cast member in a new Netflix original variety show Busted!.

In February 2018, Oh was cast in the action web drama Dokgo Rewind as the male lead. In May 2018, it was announced that Sehun will be starring in the web drama Secret Queen Makers which is produced by Lotte Duty Free. On September 14, 2018, Oh with fellow Exo member Chanyeol released a collaborative single, "We Young", for SM Station X 0.

On June 28, 2019, it was confirmed that Oh and Chanyeol were preparing to debut as the group's second sub-unit Exo-SC. They released their first EP, What a Life, on July 22, 2019.

On May 24, 2020, Oh became the new brand spokesperson of Dr. Jart+ in China. After becoming the brand's spokesperson, Dr. Jart+ achieved the highest sales ever during China's mid-year shopping festival and Oh's limited mask set sold 20 thousand pieces in nine minutes.

In 2021, Oh starred in the fantasy  movie Catman which was released and became one of the first works released in China that has a South Korean star involved after the Korean Wave restriction in China. Later the same year, he played a supporting role in the SBS drama Now, We Are Breaking Up.

In 2022, Oh made his cinema debut in the movie The Pirates: The Last Royal Treasure. In March 2022, it was announced that Sehun would be playing the main role in the upcoming TVING original drama "Everything That We Loved".

Fashion
In 2017 and 2018, Oh attended Louis Vuitton's fashion shows in Paris. He was announced as the Best Dressed Man in Louis Vuitton's show consecutively for both the years, 2017 and 2018. 

In January 2017, Vogue Korea released a pictorial with Oh wearing products from the Moncler Gamme Bleu 2017 Collection. In December, Oh attended Moncler's Hong Kong flagship opening party.

In 2018, Oh became the second South Korean male idol after G-Dragon to be featured on the cover of Vogue Korea for its 22nd anniversary. It became the best-selling issue since the magazine's inception in 1996. Oh became the ambassador for the Italian luxury fashion house Zegna's clothing line XXX alongside Chinese singer and actor William Chan.

In January 2020, Oh attended Berluti's fashion show in Paris. He then modeled for the brand's 2020 Spring/Summer Menswear Collection, and the pictorial and fashion films were released through W Korea's March issue.In September, Oh was announced as one of the three protagonists in Cartier's digital project, Pasha De Cartier. Oh was announced as the new face of Dior Men in October 2020. Oh was the first Man of Dior Global Ambassador in December 2021.

Discography

Songs

Songwriting
All credits are adapted from the Korea Music Copyright Association (KOMCA), unless stated otherwise.

Filmography

Film

Television series

Web series

Television shows

Web shows

Music videos

Ambassadorship

Awards and nominations

References

External links

 
 

1994 births
Exo members
Living people
Male actors from Seoul
Models from Seoul
Rappers from Seoul
Singers from Seoul
Mandarin-language singers of South Korea
School of Performing Arts Seoul alumni
South Korean dance musicians
South Korean male dancers
South Korean male idols
South Korean male singers
South Korean male pop singers
South Korean male rappers
South Korean male film actors
South Korean male television actors
South Korean male web series actors